"Since When" is a song by Canadian rock band 54-40. The song is the first single and title track of the band's eighth studio album, Since When. The song is the highest-charting single in the band's history, peaking at No. 11 on the RPM singles chart in Canada. The song won the award for "Best Song" at the West Coast Music Awards, with the song's music video winning the award for "Best Video".

Charts

References

External links

1998 singles
54-40 songs
1998 songs
Columbia Records singles